The Sossego Forest Biological Station is a private natural heritage reserve in the state of Minas Gerais, Brazil. It holds a population of the critically endangered northern muriqui, a primate.

Location

The Sossego Forest Biological Station is in the municipalities of Simonésia and Manhuaçu, Minas Gerais.
It holds the largest continuous remnant of Atlantic Forest in the region.
The advance of coffee plantations and pastures in the region is further fragmenting the forest and reducing its area.

History

The Sossego Forest Biological Station was created by ordinance 20-N DOU 34 of 18 February 1998, the property of the Fundação Biodiversitas (Biodiversity Foundation).
The management plan was approved by the Chico Mendes Institute for Biodiversity Conservation (ICMBio) on 7 January 2015.

Conservation activities

The main purpose is to help preserve the critically endangered northern muriqui (Brachyteles hypoxanthus), the largest primate in the Americas.
It is estimated that between 700 and 1,000 Northern muriquis live in the Atlantic Forest remnants in Minas Gerais and Espírito Santo, with confirmed populations in just ten forest fragments in Minas Gerais.
Other endangered species include the cougar (Puma concolor) and black-fronted titi (Callicebus nigrifrons).
The plants Cariniana legalis and Dicksonia sellowiana are also endangered.

The station is a center for scientific studies in the area, and may become part of an ecological corridor with the  Feliciano Miguel Abdala Private Natural Heritage Reserve in Caratinga.
The RPPN has infrastructure for visitors and researchers, and has potential for biological, ecological and sociological research.
The organizers have undertaken environmental education and organization in the nearby communities, leading to creation of the Association of Friends of Protection of the Simonésia Forests.
They have encouraged development of more sustainable agricultural practices.
The Biodiversity Foundation has partnered with the Doces Matas Project, along with the managers of the nearby Caparaó National Park and Rio Doce State Park.

Notes

Sources

Private natural heritage reserves of Brazil
Protected areas established in 1998
1998 establishments in Brazil
Protected areas of Minas Gerais